Canterbury Oast Trust (COT) is a registered charity in England which sets up, manages and supports businesses providing work and training for people with learning disabilities in Kent and East Sussex, as well as providing homes, care and educational support.

Its greatest site is the South of England Rare Breeds Centre at Woodchurch, near Ashford, Kent, which is a tourist attraction. It chiefly comprises a farm, animal sanctuary, restaurant, plant nursery and conference facility, all providing occupational opportunities for people with learning difficulties.

Other sites are:
Coterie Tea Rooms in Rye, East Sussex
Woodland management and woodcrafts businesses at Poulton Wood near Aldington, Kent
A college for people with learning difficulties, Harrington College.

The South of England Rare Breeds Centre has displays of various farm animals, a children's petting barn, children's and toddlers play areas, discovery and wildlife gardens, walk through aviary and butterfly tunnel, falconry displays, woodland walks and the Granary Restaurant. Buildings from a Georgian farm (Yonsea Farm) are being re-located to the site as a preservation project. The Centre offers National Curriculum-based activities for visiting school groups. It is one of sixteen Rare Breeds Survival Trust approved farm parks, and features a variety of rare breeds. Sheep breeds include Manx Loaghtan, Jacobs, Lincoln Longwool, Wensleydales and Portlands; Pig breeds include Berkshires, British Lops, Gloucestershire Old Spots, Middle Whites and Tamworths; cattle include British Whites, Gloucesters and Beef Shorthorns; and there are also Bagot goats. Also located at the Centre is The Falcons Centre conference facility, which as well as providing for corporate meetings, is licensed for civil marriage ceremonies and caters for events such as banquets and dances. From 2008 the Centre will be the home of the annual Bilsington Craft Fair (28/29 June in 2008).

Poulton Wood is a  coppiced woodland and Local Nature Reserve renowned for its bluebells. It has free public access. It adjoins Homelands, a listed building dating from the 17th century in Aldington which is used by the Canterbury Oast Trust as a residential building. The wood includes Ash, Hornbeam and Oak trees. Poulton Wood Works is run by the Trust to manage the woodland, and also produces craft products, wooden furniture and offers a local tree felling service.

References

External links
Canterbury Oast Trust
South of England Rare Breeds Centre
Rare Breeds Survival Trust
Blog run by a worker at the Rare Breeds Centre

 

Tourist attractions in Kent
Special education in the United Kingdom
Borough of Ashford
Organisations based in Kent
Agriculture museums in the United Kingdom
Charities based in England